720 Park Avenue is a historic residential building in Lenox Hill on the Upper East Side of Manhattan in New York City, USA. A cooperative, the building has 34 apartments, a gymnasium and storage spaces. It is secured by a full-time doorman.

History
The 17-story building was completed in 1928. It was designed by Cross & Cross and Rosario Candela in the Neoclassical architectural style. It is 62.18 meters tall.

In the 1930s, Jesse I. Straus, the co-owner of Macy's who served as the United States Ambassador to France from 1933 to 1936, lived in a duplex in this building.

Billionaire Robert Ziff also owns an apartment at 720 Park Avenue

In 2008, diplomat Carl Spielvogel, who served as the United States Ambassador to the Slovak Republic from 2000 to 2001, sold his apartment in the building to businessman Peter S. Kraus, the chairman and chief executive officer of AllianceBernstein, for US$37 million. In 2013, an apartment was listed for US$25 million.

References

Residential buildings completed in 1928
Condominiums and housing cooperatives in Manhattan
Neoclassical architecture in New York City
Upper East Side
Park Avenue
Residential buildings in Manhattan